South Carolina Highway 290 (SC 290) is a  state highway in the northwestern part of the U.S. state of South Carolina. It courses through central Greenville and Spartanburg Counties.

Route description
The west terminus of South Carolina Highway 290 is with its junction with US Highway 25 (US 25) approximately halfway between Travelers Rest and Tigerville. It generally follows a southeast route through the small villages of Locust Hill and Sandy Flat before entering Greer. Within Greer, its course changes to an easterly direction and it continues over the county border into Spartanburg County. SC 290's course changes back to a southeasterly direction as it passes through Duncan. It then crosses Interstate 85 (I-85) at exit 63 and continues on until it reaches its east terminus, the junction with US 221, in Moore.

Major intersections

Greer truck route

South Carolina Highway 290 Truck (SC 290 Truck) is a  truck route that is nearly entirely within the northern part of Greer. Approximately half of its length is in Greenville County and the other half is in Spartanburg County. It has concurrencies with U.S. Route 29 (US 29), SC 14 Truck, and SC 80.

The truck route begins at an intersection with US 29 (Wade Hampton Boulevard), at that highway's northern intersection with SC 101/SC 290. This intersection is in the east-central portion of Greenville County. US 29, SC 14 Truck, and SC 290 Truck travel to the east-northeast. Just before an intersection with the southern terminus of Ashmore Street, the roadway begins to curve to the east-southeast. Then, they intersect SC 14 (North Main Street). Here, SC 14 Truck reaches its northern terminus, while US 29 and SC 290 Truck continue to the east-southeast and then enter the southwestern part of Spartanburg County. A short distance later, they meet SC 357 (Arlington Road). They curve to the east-northeast and then leave the city limits. They have a very brief portion back in the city before leaving again. Then, they cross over the South Tyger River before they intersect the eastern terminus of SC 80 (J. Verne Smith Parkway) and the southern terminus of Gary Armstrong Road. Here, SC 290 Truck turns right, off of US 29 and onto SC 80. Here, they re-enter Greer.

SC 80 and SC 290 Truck travel to the south-southeast. Almost immediately, they cross over the South Tyger River. Then, they curve to the southwest and leave the city limits again. They bend to the south-southwest and then travel on a bridge over some railroad tracks of CSX. Immediately, they have an interchange with SC 290 (East Poinsett Street Extension). Here, they re-enter the city, and SC 290 Truck reaches its eastern terminus.

See also

References

External links

SC 290 at Virginia Highways' South Carolina Highways Annex

290
Transportation in Greenville County, South Carolina
Transportation in Spartanburg County, South Carolina